Norman Phillip Gigon (May 12, 1938 – April 1, 2013) was a Major League Baseball utility player who played for the Chicago Cubs in 1967.

Gigon hit one home run in his short career. It came off Juan Pizarro in a game against the Pittsburgh Pirates on April 23, 1967.

In addition to playing pro baseball, Gigon received degrees from both Colby College and Rhode Island University.

Immediately after retiring from pro baseball at the end of the 1967 season, Gigon took the job of baseball coach at Lafayette College.

He was born in Hackensack, New Jersey and died in Mahwah, New Jersey.

References

External links

1938 births
2013 deaths
Major League Baseball second basemen
Major League Baseball third basemen
Major League Baseball outfielders
Chicago Cubs players
Tampa Tarpons (1957–1987) players
Chattanooga Lookouts players
Lafayette Leopards baseball coaches
Williamsport Grays players
Arkansas Travelers players
Dallas–Fort Worth Spurs players
Buffalo Bisons (minor league) players
San Diego Padres (minor league) players
Tacoma Cubs players
Baseball players from New Jersey
Sportspeople from Hackensack, New Jersey
Colby Mules baseball players
University of Rhode Island alumni